Euriphene milnei, the cinnamon nymph, is a butterfly in the family Nymphalidae. It is found in eastern Nigeria, Cameroon, the Republic of the Congo and the Democratic Republic of the Congo (Equateur). The habitat consists of wetter forests.

The larvae feed on Rhaptopetalum species.

References

Butterflies described in 1865
Euriphene
Butterflies of Africa
Taxa named by William Chapman Hewitson